BBM92 is a quantum key distribution without Bell's theorem developed using polarized entangled photon pairs by Charles H. Bennett , Gilles Brassard and N. David Mermin in 1992. It is named after the trio's surnames as (Bennett, Brassard and Mermin, BBM92). It uses decoy state of multiple photon instead of single. The key differences in E91 protocol and B92 uses only two states instead of four states used by E91 protocol and BB84      

It is used for non orthogonal quantum transmission 0 can be encrypted as 0 degree and 1 as 45 degree in diagonal basis BB92 protocol. There are no eavesdropping secure and hack proof  for distance of 200-300 m.

References 

Quantum cryptography
Photonics